Mario Prosperi (born 4 August 1945 in Melide) is a retired Swiss football goalkeeper.

He got 21 caps for Switzerland between 26 May 1965 and 9 May 1973. He was an unused substitute at the 1966 World Cup. He played in qualifying games for both the 1970 FIFA World Cup and 1974 FIFA World Cup.

Clubs 
 1963–1976 : FC Lugano
 1976–1981 : FC Chiasso

References

1945 births
Living people
Swiss men's footballers
Association football goalkeepers
1966 FIFA World Cup players
Switzerland international footballers
FC Chiasso players
FC Lugano players
Accademia Nazionale di Arte Drammatica Silvio D'Amico alumni
Sportspeople from Ticino